Marija Vukčević is a Montenegrin football striker currently playing for ASD Res Roma in the Italian first tier. She formerly played in the Serbian First League for Mašinac Niš, with whom she also played the European Cup, and after that she played for ASD Real Marsico.

Vukčević also played for the Serbia and Montenegro national team until Montenegro declared its independence in 2006. Following the foundation of the Montenegro national team in 2012 she was appointed its captain. She scored in the team's first international.

International goals

References

1986 births
Living people
Montenegrin women's footballers
Women's association football forwards
Montenegro women's international footballers
ŽFK Mašinac PZP Niš players
Res Roma players
Serie A (women's football) players
Montenegrin expatriate footballers
Montenegrin expatriate sportspeople in Italy
Expatriate women's footballers in Italy
A.C.F. Brescia Calcio Femminile players
Footballers from Podgorica
Roma Calcio Femminile players